The 1964 Missouri Tigers baseball team represented the University of Missouri in the 1964 NCAA University Division baseball season. The Tigers played their home games at the original Simmons Field. The team was coached by Hi Simmons in his 26th season at Missouri.

The Tigers lost the College World Series, defeated by the Minnesota Golden Gophers in the championship game.

Roster

Schedule and results

Schedule Source:

Awards and honors 
Gary Woods
All Tournament Team

Keith Weber
First Team All-American

Dave Harvey
First Team All-American

References

Missouri
Missouri Tigers baseball seasons
Missouri Tigers baseball
College World Series seasons
Big Eight Conference baseball champion seasons